The Noblewoman Vera Sheloga is an opera in one act by Nikolai Rimsky-Korsakov. Rimsky-Korsakov wrote the libretto, which he based on the first act of the play The Maid of Pskov by Lev Alexandrovich Mey. The opera was composed in 1898, based on the prologue composed by Rimsky-Korsakov for the second version of his setting of the play as an opera.  The first and third versions of the opera The Maid of Pskov omit the action and material of the prologue.

The work was first performed in Moscow in 1898. It was later used as a prologue to The Maid of Pskov in a 1901 performance.

Performance history
The premiere performance took place in Moscow on 27 December 1898 at the Solodovnikov Theater. As a one-act opera, it was first given in the US on 9 May 1922 in New York.

Roles

Synopsis
Place: Pskov, Russia.
Time: 1555

Vera's husband has been away on a campaign. In the meantime, she has given birth to Olga.

She confesses to her unmarried sister, Nadezhda, of having been wooed by a man who passed through earlier (the man is Ivan the Terrible; this is not revealed in the libretto of this opera, but is the matter of the opera The Maid of Pskov to which this is a prequel), and that the baby is not her husband's.

As this conversation ends, Vera's husband finally returns, surprised by the presence of the baby.  Upon his demand to know where the baby came from, Nadezhda saves her sister by claiming to be the mother.

Recordings
Audio Recordings (Mainly studio recordings)

Source: www.operadis-opera-discography.org.uk
1947, Semyon Sakharov (conductor), Bolshoi Theatre Orchestra, Sofia Panova (Vera Sheloga), Elena Gribova (Nadezhda), Maria Levina (Vlasevna), Vladimir Gavryushov(Boyar Sheloga), Nikolai Shchegolkov (Prince Tokmakov)
1980, Stoyan Angelov (conductor), Bulgarian Radio Symphony Orchestra, Stefka Evstatieva (Vera Sheloga), Alexandrina Milcheva-Nonova (Nadezhda), Stefka Mineva (Vlasevna), Peter Bakardzhiev (Boyar Sheloga), Dimiter Stanchev (Prince Tokmakov)
1985, Mark Ermler (conductor), Bolshoy Theatre Orchestra, Tamara Milashkina (Vera Sheloga), Olga Teryushnova (Nadezhda), Nina Grigorieva (Vlasevna), Vladimir Karimov (Boyar Sheloga/Prince Tokmakov)

References
Notes

Sources
 
Holden, Amanda (Ed.), The New Penguin Opera Guide, New York: Penguin Putnam, 2001. 
Warrack, John and West, Ewan, The Oxford Dictionary of Opera New York: OUP: 1992 

Operas by Nikolai Rimsky-Korsakov
Russian-language operas
Operas
1898 operas
One-act operas
Operas based on plays
Operas set in Russia
Fictional princes